The 2007–08 season was the 104th season of competitive football in Turkey.

Managerial changes

Events

National team

Honours

Club Honours

Player Honours
Player of the Year
Semih Şentürk (Fenerbahçe)
Youth Player of the Year
Mehmet Topal (Galatasaray)

Team of the Year

Top scorer

Transfer deals

Retirements

References

 
Seasons in Turkish football
Turkish 2007